The Centennial Park Pan Am BMX Centre is a BMX cycling facility at Centennial Park in the Etobicoke district of Toronto, Ontario, Canada, that hosted BMX Cycling at the 2015 Pan American Games. During the games the venue included temporary seating for 2,000 spectators.

Description
Prior to its development, the site was an empty grass area next Centennial Park's baseball diamonds at the corner of Eglinton Avenue West and Centennial Park Road.

The BMX facility cost  to build and features a  track in a closed loop design consisting of four straightaways, three banked turns, and multiple jumps. The track includes two start ramps; an  starting platform for professional and international competitions and a  platform for youths and beginners.

The facility was originally supposed to be built at Ontario Place but was moved to Centennial Park for unknown reasons. The move faced opposition from city councillor Doug Holyday who said "We want people to come with their families [to Centennial] and be able to sit down and have a picnic. We want to be able to walk around the place without getting hit by a baseball or run over by a bike. And that's the way the place should be."

Upon the completion of the games, the facility was opened for public use. The facility is open from dawn to dusk daily, from May 1 to October 31, and is maintained by the City of Toronto.

Major competitions hosted

See also
Venues of the 2015 Pan American and Parapan American Games

References

External links
City of Toronto – Centennial Park Pan Am BMX Centre
Toronto 2015 – Centennial Park Pan Am BMX Centre

Sports venues in Toronto
Etobicoke
Sports venues completed in 2015
Venues of the 2015 Pan American Games
BMX tracks
2015 establishments in Ontario